Moondog 2 is the sixth album by American composer Moondog AKA Louis Thomas Hardin.

This album was the followup to the 1969 album Moondog. Produced with James William Guercio, it featured Moondog's daughter June Hardin as a vocalist.

Unlike his previous instrumental album, which was largely performed by an orchestra, Moondog 2 contains vocal compositions in canons, rounds, and madrigals, and harked back to the home-recorded feel of his earliest records.  In the liner notes to the album, Hardin states he first began writing rounds in the late winter or early spring of 1951 but soon moved on to instrumental music.  But after he'd heard in 1968 that Big Brother and the Holding Company had recorded "All Is Loneliness" he took to writing them again.

The album has been re-released twice as a 2-for-1 CD combining Moondog and Moondog 2: once by CBS in 1989, and once by Beat Goes On Records in 2001.

Reception
Big Brother and the Holding Company featuring Janis Joplin covered the song "All Is Loneliness" on their 1967 self-titled album. The song was also covered by Antony and the Johnsons during their 2005 tour. New York band The Insect Trust play a cover of Moondog's song "Be a Hobo" on their album Hoboken Saturday Night.

Track listing

All compositions by Moondog (Louis Hardin)

 "Bells Are Ringing"  – 1:19
 "Voices Of Spring"  – 1:47
 "What's The Most Exciting Thing?"  – 2:31
 "All Is Loneliness"  – 1:16
 "My Tiny Butterfly"  – 1:12
 "Why Spend A Dark Night With Me?"  – 1:09
 "Coffee Beans"  – 2:10
 "Down Is Up"  – 1:07
 "Be A Hobo"  – 1:09
 "Remember"  – 1:52
 "I Love You"  – 1:08
 "Nero's Expedition"  – 1:52
 "No, The Wheel Was Never Invented"  – 1:20
 "With My Wealth"  – 1:35
 "This Student Of Life"  – 1:24
 "Some Trust All"  – 1:28
 "Wine, Woman And Song"  – 2:23
 "Sadness"  – 1:22
 "Maybe"  – 2:03
 "Each Today Is Yesterday's Tomorrow"  – 1:37
 "Imagine"  – 2:16
 "You The Vandal  – 2:08
 "Trees Against The Sky"  – 1:18
 "Behold"  – 1:27
 "Sparrow"  – 1:37
 "Pastoral"  – 2:42

Personnel

Louis Hardin - composition & musical direction, percussion, vocals
June Hardin - vocals
James William Guercio - percussion
Kay Jafee - virginal, recorder, piano, harpsichord, ancient organ
Michael Jafee - recorder, guitar
Steven Silverstein - schom
Judith Davidoff - viola de gamba
Gillian Stevens - troubadour harp

References

1971 albums
CBS Records albums
Moondog albums
Albums produced by James William Guercio